Ladislav Helge (21 August 1927 – 31 January 2016) was a Czech film director and screenwriter. He directed 7 films between 1957 and 1967, including Škola otců (1957). He also wrote screenplays for 5 films. He started as an assistant director for Jiří Krejčík in 1947 and directed his first movie in 1957. After 1968 he wasn't allowed to direct another film and worked at a post office. From 1977 to 1992 he worked as a screenwriter in Laterna magika. From the mid-1990s, he headed the department of film direction at Film and TV School of the Academy of Performing Arts in Prague.

Filmography

Škola otců (1957)
Velká samota (1959)
Jarní povětří (1961)
Bílá oblaka (1962)
Bez svatozáře (1963)
První den mého syna (1964)
Stud (1967)

References

External links

1927 births
2016 deaths
Czech film directors
Czechoslovak film directors
Czech screenwriters
Male screenwriters